Hollywood Love Story is an American television series hosted by Paris Hilton and broadcast by Viceland, starting on July 11, 2018. It was billed as "an exploration into the turbulent and, oftentimes, dark world of social media stardom".

Premise
Hollywood Love Story is hosted by Paris Hilton and introduces several aspiring artists and Instagram figures trying to make it in modern day Los Angeles.

Episodes
 "Riiottt"
 "Sergio and the Spirit Sisters"
 "Sky"
 "Maddie"
 "Mei & Remy"
 "Josh"
 "Moe"
 "Angel"

See also
 List of programs broadcast by Viceland

References

External links
 
 

2018 American television series debuts
Viceland original programming
Paris Hilton